Lorraine Louie (October 14, 1955 - November 20, 1999) was an American graphic designer.

She designed covers for such books as Ellen Foster, Bright Lights, Big City, and The Joy Luck Club.

References

External links
Lorraine Louie and the Art of Vintage Contemporaries

1999 deaths
1955 births
American graphic designers
Women graphic designers
20th-century American artists
20th-century American women artists